Admiral Douglas Lionel Dent  (7 August 1869 – 11 July 1959) was a Royal Navy officer who became Chief of the Submarine Service.

Naval career
Born the son of Rear Admiral Charles Calmady Bayley Dent, Dent joined the Royal Navy in July 1882.

Promoted to captain on 30 June 1908, he became commanding officer of the cruiser  in March 1910.

Dent served in the First World War becoming commanding officer of the battleship  in January 1915, of the cruiser  in June 1915, of the battleship  in June 1916 and of the battleship  in June 1917. He went on to be Chief of the Submarine Service in August 1919 and Director of Naval Equipment at the Admiralty in May 1922 before retiring in May 1924.

Family
Dent married Olive Kate MacArthur; their children include Flying Officer Richard Ewer Dent.

References

1869 births
1959 deaths
Royal Navy admirals
Companions of the Order of the Bath
Companions of the Order of St Michael and St George